Eupogonius flavocinctus is a species of beetle in the family Cerambycidae. It was described by Henry Walter Bates in 1872. It is known from Costa Rica and Honduras.

References

Eupogonius
Beetles described in 1872